Herbacetin is a flavonol, a type of flavonoid.

Glycosides 
Herbacetin diglucoside can be isolated from flaxseed hulls.

Rhodionin is a herbacetin rhamnoside found in Rhodiola species.

Other related compounds 
Rhodiolin, a flavonolignan, is the product of the oxidative coupling of coniferyl alcohol with the 7,8-dihydroxy grouping of herbacetin. It can be found in the rhizome of Rhodiola rosea.

References

Flavonols
Hydroxyquinols